

Location 
Nhật Lệ Beach is a beach in Đồng Hới city, the capital of Quảng Bình Province, home to World Heritage Site Phong Nha-Kẻ Bàng National Park. The beach is located on the mouth of the Nhật Lệ River emptying into the South China Sea.

About 
Nhat Le Beach has white sand and clear blue sea. Nhat Le Beach is also famous for a great deal of beautiful cultural activities and historical sight-seeings. It has inspired for composers, authors to make many songs, poems, pictures and so forth in a long time. The beach is good for families with kids, Seniors, Couples, Solos, Groups. It is completely free to visit the beach.

References

External links

 Nhat Le beach in Quang Binh - Vietnam.

Landforms of Quảng Bình province
Beaches of Vietnam
Tourist attractions in Quảng Bình province